William Jeffrey "Jeff" Komlo (July 30, 1956 – March 14, 2009) was an American professional football quarterback who played for the Detroit Lions, the Atlanta Falcons and the Tampa Bay Buccaneers of the NFL. He was born in Cheverly, Maryland.

Football career
Coming out of DeMatha High School in Hyattsville, Maryland, Komlo wasn't heavily recruited. He'd been a star for both the football and baseball team (playing shortstop and serving as the team's clean up hitter). However, he aspired to be like his father William, who played college football for Maryland in the 1950s. He first attended Fork Hill Military Academy to sharpen his skills, and then transferred to Delaware, where Komlo was told by head coach Tubby Raymond he could try and make the team as a walk-on, which he did. Komlo led the Blue Hens to a 10-4 record and a berth in the 1978 NCAA Division II championship game, which they lost, 10-9, to Eastern Illinois University. During his Delaware career, Komlo set eleven school records and passed for 5,256 yards.

Komlo was selected by the Detroit Lions in the ninth round (231st overall) of the 1979 NFL Draft, and was expected to be club's third-string quarterback. However, after a season-ending injury to starting quarterback Gary Danielson in a pre-season contest, head coach Monte Clark tabbed Danielson's backup, veteran Joe Reed, to start the season opener in Tampa. Things promptly got worse for the Lions: not only were they thrashed, 31-16, but Reed went down with a leg injury in the fourth quarter, forcing Komlo into the game. With no better options, Detroit decided to start Komlo in the club's second game against Washington: a rare instance of such a low-drafted rookie QB being handed an NFL starting job. In his only full season as a pro signal-caller, Komlo started fourteen games and went 183-for-368 for 2,238 yards, 11 touchdowns and 23 interceptions. Favoured by many to win the NFC Central, the 1979 season quickly turned into a disaster for Detroit, as Komlo went 2-12 as a starting quarterback; his two victories (a 24-23 win over the Atlanta Falcons and a 20-0 win over the Chicago Bears) were the Lions' only wins all season, as they set a club record with 14 losses. 

In 1980, Komlo threw only four passes all year, as Danielson returned; in 1981, Komlo was mainly the third-string quarterback, with Danielson being supplanted as starter by Eric Hipple. He did start two games that season, including a 27-21 loss to the Denver Broncos that marked his final appearance in a Detroit uniform.

In 1982, Komlo went to the Atlanta Falcons but did not get into a game. In 1983, his final NFL season, Komlo played for the Tampa Bay Buccaneers, but threw just eight passes in two games, stuck behind Jack "The Throwin' Samoan" Thompson and ex-New York Giant Jerry Golsteyn.

Later life and death
In May 2004, Komlo was involved in a domestic incident with his girlfriend, Jennifer Winters. After they got into an argument, Komlo shoved her out of the car, which, in a drunken state, he later crashed. He returned home, got his SUV, and later crashed that vehicle as well. He was later convicted in Chester County, Pennsylvania on two drunk-driving charges, but didn't show up to be sentenced, which resulted in a bench warrant for his arrest. In August 2005, Komlo was still on the lam, and featured on America's Most Wanted. He was also facing charges of cocaine possession and assault, and police wanted to question him about possible arson at his homes in West Palm Beach and Chester Springs, Pennsylvania.

Fleeing the country, Komlo ended up in Greece, working for a hair implant clinic in Athens called NHI. The clinic caters mostly to Britons, who fly to the Greek capital for something called the Choi Method, which, according to the NHI website, is "a procedure far too labour-intensive to operate in the UK."

Komlo was killed in an automobile crash in southern Athens on March 14, 2009. Pennsylvania law enforcement initially questioned whether he might have faked his own death to avoid the charges. Five days later, the Acting Chief Chester County sheriff's detective, Jim Vito, stated that the authorities were satisfied that Komlo was in fact dead.

References

 "The Wrong Turn" by L. Jon Wertheim, Sports Illustrated (June 15, 2009)

External links
Stats at DatabaseFootball

1956 births
2009 deaths
American expatriates in Greece
American football quarterbacks
Atlanta Falcons players
Delaware Fightin' Blue Hens football players
Detroit Lions players
People from Cheverly, Maryland
Players of American football from Maryland
Road incident deaths in Greece
Sportspeople from the Washington metropolitan area
Tampa Bay Buccaneers players